Theological Studies is a quarterly peer-reviewed academic journal published by the Society of Jesus in the United States covering research on all aspects of theology. The journal is hosted by Georgetown University and was established in 1940. The current editor-in-chief is Christopher Steck (Georgetown University).

References

External links 
 

Georgetown University
Jesuit publications
Catholic studies journals
Quarterly journals
English-language journals
Publications established in 1940